Sirugudal is a village located in the Perambalur district of Tamil Nadu, India.

References

Cities and towns in Perambalur district